Chuck Billy (Chico Bento in the original Brazilian strips) is the main character from Chuck Billy 'n' Folks, created by Brazilian cartoonist Mauricio de Sousa. He is the biggest work of Mauricio after Monica's Gang, and he has his own cartoon magazine and even some VHS and DVD movies, following Monica's steps.

History 
He was created back in 1961, inspired on Mauricio's real life grandfather's brother, whose stories were told by his grandmother, who would inspire a character from the same universe: Vó Dita, described as Chuck's grandmother. It first came to public in 1961, in a short cartoon with two other characters, his best friend Benny and his Japanese friend Taka.

Back in the 1980s, the cartoon was polemic due to the dialogues. Mauricio was trying to represent how a hillbilly would talk by writing his lines with typical mistakes and incorrections of Brazilian Portuguese (actually the caipira dialect, which is not considered a dialect in Brazil). Later on, that was adapted and every mistake is indicated either in bold or some variant ways.

In 2009, a polemical short strip featuring Chuck Billy and an anonymous character was featured in an issue of Viva! magazine, released in the Brazilian state of Bahia to assist teachers of the state schools. The strip featured a boy saying "My father has more than 800 heads of cattle", to which Chuck answers: "Tell him to take them all up his ass." In the original strip, the boy asks the same thing but ends his sentence with "...what about yours, Chuck?". Billy then simply answers: "My father's got only one cow, but he's got the whole thing." Mauricio de Sousa later stated in his Twitter profile:

Governor of Bahia Jaques Wagner later apologized for the error.

Description 
Chuck's real original name is Francisco Bento, based on his father's father, Chico being a common nickname for boys with that first name. He is a stereotypical Brazilian caipira child (more like a country person), who walks bare foot, always with a straw hat and lives in a fictional little country town, called Vila Abobrinha. He goes fishing, steal guavas and swims in the local river in his free time.

Different from other Mauricio's characters, Chuck Billy attends school, and some of his strips are even set in the local school, even though he is not a good student at all. He makes every kind of mistake a student can, such as being late for school, getting bad grades and not paying attention to class - though he also attains some success every once in a while.

Because the set is the Brazilian countryside, where there's Nature aplenty, many of Chuck Billy's stories are taken on the subject of environmental awareness and Brazilian folklore. The sacis are recurring characters, nearly always against the humans, such as popular folk creatures such as the werewolf, the Headless Mule and the Boitatá.

In the future, he has already been shown as having a son called Urutaia, conveniently named after a jaguar cub he once befriended, but was also portrayed having a son called Quinzinho Bento, whereas a woman next to him (presumably his wife Rosinha) was carrying a toddler.

See also 

Chuck Billy 'n' Folks
Mauricio de Sousa
Monica's Gang

References

External links 
Official site (features list of characters, games, downloads, and more):
English version
Portuguese version

Monica's Gang
Fictional hillbillies
Fictional Brazilian people
Child characters in comics
Comics characters introduced in 1961
Fictional characters based on real people
Animated human characters